Savige is a surname. Notable people with the surname include:

Jaya Savige (born 1978), Australian poet and critic
John Russell Savige (1908–1977), Australian soldier
Stanley Savige (1890–1954), Australian soldier

See also
Savage (disambiguation)
Savidge (disambiguation)